The house of Dragomir Popovic is a cultural and historical monument in Ivanjica. The construction of the house is characteristic of the Moravica District, where Milinko Kusic was born, a national hero.

Milinko Kusic was born in 1912, started education first in Ivanjici and later studied philosophy and law at the University of Belgrade. Milinko Kusic was a prominent fighter and leader of the uprising in World War II. Today, his name carries elementary school in Ivanjica, as well as the main street of the city.

See also
 Stara čaršija (Ivanjica)

References

External links
 Official website of municipality of Ivanjica 

Ivanjica
Houses in Serbia